Resurrection Catholic Secondary School is a Catholic high school in Kitchener, Waterloo Region, Ontario, Canada.

Awards
Resurrection CSS has a variety of awards that students can apply to annually.  In addition, a collection of awards are presented to students who qualify for them based on merit or academic achievement.

Most awards can be found here:
https://resurrection.wcdsb.ca/student-services/guidance/pathways-night/

Athletics
Resurrection has its athletics program, which has recently seen the following teams achieve success at the local and/or provincial levels:
2008 OFSAA Western Bowl Champions - Senior Boys football
2008 CWOSSA Champions - Senior Boys football
2008 WCSSAA Champions - Senior Boys football
2009 WCSSAA Champions - Senior Boys football
2009 CWOSSA AAAA Champions - Junior Boys Basketball
2010 CWOSSA AAAA Champions - Junior Boys Basketball
2010 CWOSSA AAAA Champions - Junior Girls Volleyball
2010 CWOSSA Champions - Girls Field Hockey
2010 OFSAA Gold Medalists - Girls Field Hockey
2011 CWOSSA Finalist - Girls Field Hockey
2011 OFSAA Gold Medalists - Girls Field Hockey
2012 CWOSSA Champions - Girls Field Hockey
2012 OFSAA Gold Medalists - Girls Field Hockey
2013 OFSAA Silver Medalists - Girls Field Hockey
2014 WCSSAA Champions - Jr. Boys Football
2015 D8 Champions - Jr. Boys Football
2015 D8/CWOSSA  Champions - Sr Boys Football
2015 OFSAA Metro Bowl Championships - Sr Boys Football
2016 D8 Champions - Jr. Boys Football
2017 D8 Champions - Jr. Boys Football
2018 D8 Champions - Jr. Boys Football
2018 D8 Champions - Sr. Boys Football
2019 D8 Champions - Jr. Boys Football
2020 D8 Champions - Jr. Boys Football
2022 D8 Champions - Jr. Boys Football
2022 D8/CWOSSA  Champions - Sr Boys Football
2022 OFSAA Metro Bowl Champions - Sr Boys football
Resurrection has introduced the PEAT athletics program, which is an enrichment program for self-motivated student-athletes who demonstrate exceptional athletic potential in a given sport. Applicants to the program must also possess strong academic commitment, and be positive contributors to the Resurrection community. Applicants must be working toward a provincial/ national/ international championship outside of high school sport. The PEAT program will focus on developing essential transferable skills including speed, agility, endurance, power, and flexibility.

Resurrection is a member of the eight team District 8 Athletic Association.

Academics
During the course of the 2011-2012 school year, Resurrection's Reach for the Top team won the regional tournament for Waterloo, and therefore ended up attending the Provincial championships, where the team placed 13th in the Province. 
Also, a notable program Resurrection Catholic Secondary School has to offer is UCEP (University Cooperative Education Program), where students in either grade 12 or 13 get to spend their first semester at the University of Waterloo, Wilfrid Laurier or St. Jerome's University. This program is known as a specialized co-op and it supplies those students who excel with an outstanding experience. The student is then able to gain a co-op position with a professor on any of these campuses.

The Waterloo Catholic Secondary School Board offers a program known as High Skills Major. In this program, the student will receive a number of certifications and will be able to attend many courses related to a specific career path such as health and wellness. The student will also have to take certain courses in your upper years (grade 11 and 12) that relate to this career path. For example, in health and wellness a student would have to take some science courses. It is also a necessity to take co-op, and to receive a placement in the career of the student's choice. Once all these requirements are met, students who participated in the program will receive a designation on their diploma.

Student Council

Student Council otherwise abbreviated to SAC (Student Activities Council) acts as the Student Government of Resurrection Catholic Secondary School. The council is composed of two equal Presidents elected by the student body. As well as a teacher adviser chosen by the Principal. The two Presidents and the SAC director jointly appoint a council of approximately 35 students each year to help organize events and activities and better represent the school community. The Presidents and the Director also appoint a Cabinet composed of Students from the already selected pool of student council members who have shown strong leadership in the past. These cabinet members are referred to as Ministers and each one is charged with leading one of the seven ministries (Special Events, Simple Celebrations, Faith and Wellness, Student Voice, Communications, Community Affairs and Inter Club Council) all other members of Student Council are referred to as representatives. Together student council works to execute multiple events and carry out many initiatives to engage students and enrich student culture.

Notable alumni
 Sarah Manninen (1995) - actress
 Andrew Pickett (2014) - CFL, Ottawa Redblacks
 Kyle Platzer (2013) - OHL, London Knights, Owen Sound Attack, NHL draft.

See also
List of high schools in Ontario

References

Waterloo Catholic District School Board
Catholic secondary schools in Ontario
Educational institutions established in 1990
High schools in the Regional Municipality of Waterloo
1990 establishments in Ontario
Schools in Kitchener, Ontario